"Scarlett O'Hara" (also spelt "Scarlet O'Hara") is an instrumental by Jerry Lordan, first released as a single in April 1963 by Jet Harris and Tony Meehan. It peaked at number 2 on the UK Singles Chart.

Recording and release
"Scarlett O'Hara", named after the fictional character from the novel Gone with the Wind, was recorded at Decca Studios in March 1963. The recording did not actually feature Jet Harris; instead Joe Moretti plays the lead guitar. It was released as a single with the B-side "(Doing The) Hully Gully", written by Meehan and John Rodgers, featured in the film Just for Fun.

Track listing
7": Decca / F 11644
 "Scarlet O'Hara" – 2:18
 "(Doing The) Hully Gully" – 1:50

Personnel
 Tony Meehan – drums
 Joe Moretti – electric lead bass guitar
 John Paul Jones – electric bass guitar
 Glenn and Chris Hughes – brass
There is also acoustic rhythm guitar, strings and backing vocals by unknown musicians

Charts

Lawrence Welk version

American musician and bandleader Lawrence Welk released a cover of the song as a single in May 1963 which peaked at number 89 on the Billboard Hot 100. "Scarlett O'Hara" was the lead song of an album by the same name released by Lawrence Welk and His Orchestra in 1963, which spent 27 weeks on Billboards chart of Top LPs, peaking at No. 33.

Track listing
7": Dot / 45-16488
 "Scarlet O'Hara" – 2:03
 "Breakwater" – 2:15

7": Dot / D 336 (Denmark)
 "Scarlet O'Hara" – 2:03
 "Ruby" – 2:20

Charts

Other versions
 In May 1963, American musician Bobby Gregg also released a version of the tune. It peaked at number 112 on the Billboard Bubbling Under the Hot 100.

References

1963 singles
1963 songs
Decca Records singles
Dot Records singles
Rock instrumentals
Songs written by Jerry Lordan
1960s instrumentals
Works based on Gone with the Wind